LSG2 is the second and final studio album by R&B group LSG. It was released on July 28, 2003 by Elektra Records.

Critical reception

David Jeffries from Allmusic found that "the sexier than expected LSG2 presents the singers as swashbuckling lords of the bedroom and shows little interest in crossing over to the pop world's more chaste framework. It's a good thing they allow themselves the freedom, since the album's highlights are the more racy numbers [...] Well-written and well-produced, "Yesterday"'s over the top emotion and meandering way bring reminders of Prince at his most lonely and lustful and give the album some needed substance. Elsewhere the songwriting lags, but the slick production and LSG's passionate vocals make this seduction hard to resist."

Track listing 

Samples
"Just Friends" contains portions of "Friends" as written by Lawrence Smith and Jalil Hutchins.

Charts

References

2003 albums
LSG (band) albums
Elektra Records albums